Evarcha werneri (syn. Evarcha elegans) is a jumping spider (family Salticidae) native to Ethiopia, Sudan to Uganda, Tanzania, Namibia and South Africa.

References

Salticidae
Spiders of Africa
Spiders described in 2000
Fauna of Ethiopia
Fauna of Tanzania